Cryptopontius capitalis is a species of copepods in the family Artotrogidae from the North Atlantic Ocean. It is an ectoparasitic on the sponges Crella (Crella) elegans, Oscarella lobularis and Petrosia (Petrosia) ficiformis.

References

External links 

 Cryptopontius capitatis at World Register of Marine Species (WoRMS)

Siphonostomatoida
Crustaceans described in 1895